Huntington is a suburb of Hamilton, New Zealand.

Demographics

Huntington had a population of 2,574 at the 2018 New Zealand census, an increase of 129 people (5.3%) since the 2013 census, and an increase of 1,017 people (65.3%) since the 2006 census. There were 855 households, comprising 1,230 males and 1,344 females, giving a sex ratio of 0.92 males per female. The median age was 42.6 years (compared with 37.4 years nationally), with 510 people (19.8%) aged under 15 years, 450 (17.5%) aged 15 to 29, 1,200 (46.6%) aged 30 to 64, and 414 (16.1%) aged 65 or older.

Ethnicities were 72.6% European/Pākehā, 8.4% Māori, 1.3% Pacific peoples, 23.5% Asian, and 1.9% other ethnicities. People may identify with more than one ethnicity.

The percentage of people born overseas was 29.4, compared with 27.1% nationally.

Although some people chose not to answer the census's question about religious affiliation, 44.5% had no religion, 42.9% were Christian, 0.1% had Māori religious beliefs, 1.9% were Hindu, 1.7% were Muslim, 2.2% were Buddhist and 1.6% had other religions.

Of those at least 15 years old, 666 (32.3%) people had a bachelor's or higher degree, and 270 (13.1%) people had no formal qualifications. The median income was $42,400, compared with $31,800 nationally. 606 people (29.4%) earned over $70,000 compared to 17.2% nationally. The employment status of those at least 15 was that 1,044 (50.6%) people were employed full-time, 324 (15.7%) were part-time, and 72 (3.5%) were unemployed.

See also
 List of streets in Hamilton
Suburbs of Hamilton, New Zealand

References

Suburbs of Hamilton, New Zealand